Nader v. General Motors Corp. (25 N.Y. 2d 560, 1970) was a court case in which author and automobile safety lecturer Ralph Nader claimed that General Motors had "conduct[ed] a campaign of intimidation against him in order to 'suppress plaintiff's criticism of and prevent his disclosure of information' about its products" regarding his book Unsafe at Any Speed. Mere information gathering is not sufficient for action under intrusion upon seclusion tort: "privacy is invaded only if the information sought is of a confidential nature and the defendant's conduct was unreasonably intrusive." Judge Brietel concluded that GM's actions "constitute intrusion upon privacy".

Among the court's findings was the conclusion that private detectives hired by General Motors to follow Nader were in their rights to follow him into a bank, but they crossed a line when looking over his shoulder to read what he was writing on a deposit slip.

References

1970 in New York (state)
1970 in United States case law
General Motors litigation
Law articles needing an infobox
New York (state) state case law
Ralph Nader
United States privacy case law